Building Homes from What We've Known is the debut full-length album by The Scene Aesthetic. It was released on April 7, 2006 and later re-released, with additional tracks, as a self-titled album.

Track listing
All songs written by The Scene Aesthetic.

A Formal Introduction – 1:31
So Peter, You've Become a Pirate – 3:49
Alvin Maker's Greensong – 3:36
Call It a Lullaby – 3:51
Yes, Even Stars Break – 4:03
The Alamo Is No Place for Dancing – 4:03
Beauty in the Breakdown – 3:15
Yellow Birds & Coal Mines – 3:56
This Is a Suitable Valedictory – 4:35
Dear Time Traveler, – 4:36
We've Got the Rain on Our Side – 5:15
Beauty in the Breakdown (Acoustic) – 3:14

Personnel
Andrew de Torres  – Guitar, VocalsEric Bowley – Vocals

Brandon Metcalf - Producer, Engineer, Mixer

References

2006 albums
The Scene Aesthetic albums